Rosan Perkasa Roeslani (born 31 December 1968) is an Indonesian diplomat, businessman, and tech executive who is currently the Indonesian Ambassador to the United States. He is one of the Indonesian trio who have acquired the football club Inter Milan. He was born in Jakarta and is the Chairman of the Recapital Group and Deputy General Chair of the Chamber of Commerce and Industry for Banking and Finance. On November 24, 2015, he was elected as Chairman of Kadin for the period 2015 - 2020. He won 102 votes, beating another candidate for chairman, Rahmat Gobel, who only got 27 votes at the VII Kadin National Conference at the Trans Luxury Hotel, Bandung, West Java. The total votes collected reached 129 votes, consisting of 33 regional Chamber of Commerce and Industry (Kadin) in which each province had 3 voting rights and 30 associations, each of which had 1 vote.

Business 
Together with his two friends, Sandiaga Uno and Hasbi Hafani, Rosan started his business as financial advisors. The company that was started in 1996 was finally officially established in 1997 under the name PT Republik Indonesia Funding, which is better known as Finance Indonesia. The entrepreneurial segment, which was scorned by a number of people, finally yielded sweet results. The economic crisis that has hit Indonesia since the end of '97 requires national companies to look for people who are able to revive the companies and businesses they manage. The crisis turned into a blessing for Rosan. Starting from a small office with an area of 70 square meters in Tifa Building, Setiabudi, Jakarta, Finance Indonesia began to steal the attention of large capital owners. However, blessings do not just come without hard work. It took five years, said Rosan, to really prepare the right foundation for his company. 

In 2002, Indonesia Finance changed its name to Recapital. From a small financial advisory firm, Recapital has become a large, reputable and competent company in terms of strategic cooperation, financial asset management and investors. "One time we were chatting, we could bring in investors to help unhealthy companies. Why don't we bring in investors for our company too?" said Rosan. This idea sparked the idea to expand the line of business. With finance and banking as the leading sectors, Recapital's business is growing by entering other sectors in the industrial sector where mining, infrastructure, property, to media and communications are included. In the financial sector, Recapital is present through Recapital Securities, Recapital Asset Management, Global Sarana Lintas Artha, Recapital Life Insurance (Relife), Recapital General Insurance (Reguard), and Bank Pundi. 

In addition, Recapital is also one of the owners of Bank Kesejahteraan Ekonomi and Capital Inc Investment. In the infrastructure sector, Rosan's company is one of the leaders in Indonesia through the Acuatico Group in the supply and distribution of clean water. Through the Aetra Air Indonesia business arm, Acuatico is present in Jakarta and Tangerang. Acuatico is also a clean water supplier for Ho Chi Minh City. Acuatico also provides integrated water infrastructure specifically to supply drinking water in the Rasuna Epicentrum complex under the name Rasuna Eco Park. In the property sector, Rosan through Recapital owns the Grand Kemang Hotel in an elite area of Jakarta, the Losari Spa Retreat & Coffee Plantation Hotel (now MesaStila Resort and Spa) in Magelang, Central Java, as well as two resorts in Bali, namely The Edge Villa in Uluwatu and The Edge Villa in Uluwatu. Hill Resort in Ubud. Its newest property is Karang Beras Island in the Thousand Islands, Jakarta. In the field of Media and Telecommunications, Recapital is present through Alberta Media. 

In addition, Recapital is a shareholder of PT Mahaka Media. Mahaka is a company engaged in newspaper publishing, magazine publishing, outdoor media/billboards, animation, radio networks, portals, and information technology businesses. In the Health sector, Rosan also has a Gandaria Hospital in the South Jakarta area. In the mining sector, the name Recapital emerged as one of the shareholders of Bumi Plc. One of its subsidiaries is Bumi Mineral Resources (BRM), a mining company that produces precious metals and base metals. Thus, from a staff of five, from a space of 70 square meters, Rosan has successfully grown his company to have more than 24,000 staff with offices that are spread all over the world.

Organization 
Rosan is also active in the field of organization. Since the beginning of entering the business world, Rosan has joined the Indonesian Young Entrepreneurs Association (HIPMI). As he grew older and became more influential, Rosan was elected to the board of the Indonesian Chamber of Commerce and Industry (KADIN) for the 2010-2015 period. According to his field of expertise, Rosan was entrusted as Deputy General Chair of Banking and Finance. One of Rosan's real and aspirational works in carrying out this position is the establishment of PT Palapa Nusantara Berdikari. This company aims to help financing potential SMEs throughout the archipelago through capital.

References 

Living people
1968 births
Indonesian businesspeople
Indonesian business executives
Indonesian business families
Indonesian politicians
Ambassadors of Indonesia to the United States